The Decline of Western Civilization Part II: The Metal Years is a 1988 documentary film directed by Penelope Spheeris. Filmed between August 1987 and February 1988, the film chronicles the late 80s Los Angeles heavy metal scene. It is the second film of a trilogy by Spheeris depicting life in Los Angeles at various points in time as seen through the eyes of struggling up-and-coming musicians. The first film, The Decline of Western Civilization (1981), dealt with the hardcore punk rock scene during 1979–1980. The third film, The Decline of Western Civilization Part III (1998), would later chronicle the gutter punk lifestyle of homeless teenagers in the late 1990s.

The film features a mix of live concert footage and interviews with established heavy metal performers such as Lemmy, Ozzy Osbourne, Aerosmith, Alice Cooper, Kiss, Megadeth, and W.A.S.P. Several unsigned club bands are also prominently featured, such as Odin, Seduce, and LONDON.

Synopsis
The film chronicles the heavy metal club scene in Los Angeles during the 1987-88 time period, with an emphasis placed on the glam metal subgenre. While many established artists such as Alice Cooper, Aerosmith, Ozzy Osbourne, Dave Mustaine, Gene Simmons and Paul Stanley are featured in interviews, members of several unsigned L.A. club bands are also given a share of the spotlight, including London and Odin, and Detroit's Seduce. The film also features interviews with members of Poison, Tuff, Vixen, Faster Pussycat, and W.A.S.P. Many of the struggling, unsigned acts appear convinced that worldwide stardom awaits them, and most appear to have no backup plan in place should this success fail to happen.

The film includes several interview segments with Darlyne Pettinicchio, an Orange County probation officer, discussing the dangers of metal culture on children, especially in taking heavy metal lyrics seriously and literally.

The film is well known for its many scenes featuring rock star excess. The scenes include:

 An extremely intoxicated Chris Holmes of W.A.S.P. is interviewed in a swimming pool, with his mother by his side. He stumbles through the interview, proclaiming himself "a full-blown alcoholic" and "a piece of crap" while pouring what appears to be vodka over himself. 
 In a hot tub surrounded by scantily dressed young women, Odin lead vocalist Randy O insists his band will become millionaires, more famous than The Doors and be "bigger than Zeppelin". He says that the possibility of superstardom eluding him causes him to ponder suicide.
 An interview with L.A. club owner Bill Gazzarri, whose "sexy rock and roll" dance contests at Gazzarri's on the Sunset Strip are presented as being sleazy and sexist.
 Discussions with various musicians about the way women in general, and groupies in particular, are treated badly in the metal scene.
 Riki Rachtman and Taime Downe, owners of the Cathouse club in L.A., discuss how girls get entry to the club faster if they dress "sleazy".
 Paul Stanley of Kiss is interviewed in bed, surrounded from head to toe by three half-naked girls.
 Steven Tyler and Joe Perry of Aerosmith talk about spending millions of dollars on drugs.
 Ozzy Osbourne, while cooking breakfast in a kitchen, discusses his wild rock and roll lifestyle. In a scene that was later revealed to have been manipulated in post-production, he spills orange juice all over the table, apparently due to uncontrollable shakes. Spheeris also interviews him about sobriety.
 An interview with Lemmy from Motörhead. In his autobiography, he claims that Spheeris interviewed him from a distance, possibly in an attempt to make him look stupid.
 Candid and sobering interviews from various artists about drug use, abuse, and dying (or nearly dying) from overdoses.
 Lastly, Spheeris takes her cameras to Sunset Strip to film the nightlife in 1980s Los Angeles.

Musical performances
 Lizzy Borden – "Born to be Wild"
 Faster Pussycat – "Cathouse", "Bathroom Wall"
 Seduce – "Crash Landing", "Colleen"
 London – "Breakout", "Russian Winter"
 Odin – "Little Gypsy", "12 O'Clock High"
 Megadeth – "In My Darkest Hour"

Influence and legacy
It has been claimed, most notably in the VH1 documentary series Heavy: The Story of Metal, that this film was partially responsible for the death of glam metal, and the subsequent rise of thrash metal and grunge during the next decade. The suggestion in the documentary is that fans, disgusted by the scenes of excess, decided to turn elsewhere. A similar claim was made by Dave Mustaine in his autobiography and in the book Hell Bent for Leather by British author Seb Hunter.

Faked footage
In a 1999 interview for The A.V. Club, Spheeris admitted that the scene with Ozzy Osbourne spilling orange juice was faked, and the kitchen was not Osbourne's. A more complete version of the interview, in which Osbourne does not spill juice, is included as a bonus feature on the DVD. The 2015 release of The Decline of Western Civilization, The Decline of Western Civilization Part II, and The Decline of Western Civilization Part III as a box set includes a commentary track for Part II that states that some of the scenes involving Osbourne and Holmes were faked.

Soundtrack
The soundtrack was released on Capitol Records/I.R.S. Records. However, the soundtrack does not attempt to feature all the performances that were in the movie.

Track listing

CD track listing

See also
 Heavy Metal Parking Lot
 American Hardcore
 Wayne's World - the 1992 movie adaptation of the Saturday Night Live characters Wayne and Garth (each played by Dana Carvey and Mike Myers) directed by Spheeris

References

External links
 
 
 
 
 Official trailer

1988 films
American documentary films
Films directed by Penelope Spheeris
Documentary films about heavy metal music and musicians
1988 documentary films
Documentary films about Los Angeles
Music of Los Angeles
1980s English-language films
1980s American films